Repno may refer to:

 Repno, Slovenia, a village near Šentjur, Slovenia
 Repno, Croatia, a village near Zlatar, Croatia